Phasing may refer to:

Phasing, a technique in musical composition
 Phasing, the use of the Phaser (effect), an audio signal processing technique

Science
 Phase-out of chlorofluorocarbon
Phase-out of incandescent light bulbs
Fossil fuel phase-out
Phase-out of lightweight plastic bags
Nuclear power phase-out

Entertainment
Marching band phasing
Phasing (Magic mechanic) a creature mechanic in Magic: The Gathering

See also
Phase (disambiguation)
Phaser (disambiguation)
Phasor (disambiguation)
Out-of-body experience